Planète (The Planet) was a French fantastic realism magazine created by Jacques Bergier and Louis Pauwels. It ran from 1961 to 1972.

Jacques Bergier and Louis Pauwels were the authors of the successful book The Morning of the Magicians (Le Matin des magiciens), subtitled "Introduction to Fantastic Realism," published in October 1959 (total French-language sales about 2 million copies).

The rapid, unexpected success of this book encouraged its authors to create a review entirely devoted to the same topic: the Planet (Planète), with the slogan "Nothing that's strange is foreign to us!" After two years spent in the exiguous buildings of the editor, Victor Michon (at 8 rue de Berri, Paris VIIIe), the seat of the review settled in a substantial building on the Champs-Élysées.

Jacques Bergier set himself up as intellectual heir to Charles Fort. Louis Pauwels would later be an editor of a review of an extremely different spirit, namely the Le Figaro Magazine (magazine supplement of a popular newspaper).

Circulation 
The first number was initially printed with 5,000 copies and had five reprintings. The peak of the sales exceeded 100,000 copies per issue. The ambitions of the magazine were rather eclectic, aiming more at the one objective of brainstorming than at encroaching on the field of traditional popular science magazines (a survey revealed however that 44% of Planet readers were also readers of Science & Vie, a magazine of the aforementioned category.)

Social effect 
One of the undeniable successes of this magazine is that it made authors like Jorge Luis Borges, Robert Sheckley, Fredric Brown, and Daniel Keyes known to a very general public; previously, the first of these authors was known only to a small group of literature fanatics, and the others were only known to aficionados of science-fiction magazines.

Anecdotes 
The nearby snack bar "Elysée Quick" often has a place in the appendix of the editorial team, as its cellar was often used as the legendary hold-all for Jacques Bergier's massive stash of documents. Twice per year, the members of the leading team returned to a small inn in Chevreuse valley for a 48-hour prospective assessment.

The magazine organized "Planet Conferences" (Conférences Planètes) through France, Italy, Belgium, Switzerland, Quebec, even as far as Argentina (with the participation of J. L. Borges) and in Mexico. (The first three conferences took place at the French Odéon Theatre of Jean-Louis Barrault in Paris in front of 1250 people - entry was refused to 500 others at the time of the first.) The magazine also organized "Planet debate dinners" (Dîners - Débats Planète) through "Planet workshop clubs" (Clubs - Ateliers Planète) (supervised until 1977 by Adrien Bourgeois within the associative "Planet movement" -  there were 57 Workshops in 1969), and created another bimonthly review called Plexus, a female magazine Pénéla, and editions with topics ("Planet Presence", "Planet Action", "More Planet", "Planet History"...) It published the first biblical oecumenical edition in three luxurious volumes within the "Spiritual treasury of humanity," and one of human civilizations through ten neat works of the "Metamorphoses of humanity."

The magazine engaged in collaborations with the French Musical Youth (discs and spectacles, plus a regular cultural chronicle within their review), the Mediterranean Club Planet forum was in Sicily (Céfalù) during two summers, then another in Corfou (Greece), in India during the hippie movement with three repeats (one of which was attended by Indira Gandhi), in Mexico, Egypt, Guatémala, Peru, and the US, on the topic of "the future world." In 1967, it became the producer of astonishing Parisian spectacles (voodoo, the whirling dervish, Andalusian flamenco with the participation of the ballets and orchestra of Maurice Béjart in the sport hall of Paris, thanks to the Theatre of the Nations). In May 1962, Louis Pauwels also organized a show in a Parisian gallery of four painters of fantastic realism who had been featured in the magazine.

Planet (subtitle: "The First Magazine of the Library"): 41 issues from March 1961 to May 1968, with a book supplement in color with the last issues; the "New Planet": 23 issues from September 1968 to August 1971; finally transitory "The New New Planet" (Marc de Smedt's "Planet large format" ): 3 issues, at the end of 1971 until April 1972. Additionally, there were thirty bimonthly "Planet Encyclopedias" alternated with the magazine starting in 1963, and published in conjunction with "Plexus" six times per year, and seventeen "Planet Anthologies" directed by Jacques Sternberg and Alex Grall. The magazine also had variants, through all Western Europe and South America (Pianeta, Horizonte, Planeta, Bres, Planet, etc.), as well as an edition in Arab language in 1969 (12 international editions in all). The Dutch and Italian editions are always produced here:  

Bergier's narrow personal office had posters all along the walls, featuring the characteristic humor of the movement: "You don't have to be crazy to work here... but that helps!"; and especially "Some calm, and some orthography!"

Philosophers, sociologists, and writers, such as Mircea Eliade, Edgar Morin, Odile Passeron, Jean-Bruno Renard, Umberto Eco, and Jean d'Ormesson, considered this the leading phenomenon of the Sixties.

Some of the most famous authors: Aimé Michel, Rémy Chauvin, George Langelaan, Bernard Heuvelmans, Jean Emile Charon, Raymond de Becker, Gabriel Veraldi, Jacques Mousseau (editor in chief, and future originator of the television broadcast Temps X), René Alleau, Henri Laborit, Jacques Lecomte, Guy Breton. Several sketch artists and painters of reputation made their classes there: Roland Topor, Jean Gourmelin, René Pétillon, Pierre Clayette, Pierre-Yves Trémois. The sub-editor was Arlette Peltant.

Through François Richaudeau, the leading mobility of the group moved itself around the Denoel house, with the variations of the Retz editions (which have become didactic), of the Club of the Woman, the Club of the Friends of the Book, the CELT (Culture-Art-Leisures), to some extent perpetuating the cultural outline which had been tried just after the war, with "Work and Culture" then "the World Library" of Victor Michon, Louis Pauwels and this same François Richaudeau. Today, certain works of the editions du Rocher can be considered in the spirit of the topics approached by the members of "Planet".

Fields and topics covered 
 Epistemology. The magazine made formerly ignored precursors in this field known to the general public, for example, Roger Joseph Boscovich.
 Science fiction. Writers like Fredric Brown, Daniel Keyes, Isaac Asimov, Arthur C Clarke, Ray Bradbury and Robert Sheckley were published, and some discussions about their writings.
 The Fantastic. The review devoted several articles to Lovecraft and especially to Jorge Luis Borges, about whom it also published some short stories (among them, the library of Babel).
 Futurology. An interview of Isaac Asimov in 1965 on the topic "How I see the world in 1995" turns out to be almost without fault: the only thing that Isaac Asimov had not seen coming (neither had anybody in the middle of the 1960s) was the domestic microcomputer.
 Sociology, Ethnology, Ethology. Once its role had been filled, after ten years, Planet disappeared quietly in 1972.

Succession 
Two English-language magazines are in the spirit of Planète: Omni and Wired.

See also 
 Futures studies
 Genres, subcategories and related topics to science fiction
 Golden Age of Science Fiction
 Hard science fiction
 History of science fiction
 Science fiction authors
 Science fiction Organizations

References 
Translated from the French language page, June 2006.

1961 establishments in France
1972 disestablishments in France
Defunct literary magazines published in France
Forteana
French-language magazines
Magazines established in 1961
Magazines disestablished in 1972
Magazines published in Paris
Speculative fiction magazines published in France
Western esoteric magazines